Alena Damitšová (born 16 February 1962) is a Slovak handball player. She competed for Czechoslovakia in the women's tournament at the 1988 Summer Olympics.

References

External links
 
 

1962 births
Living people
Slovak female handball players
Olympic handball players of Czechoslovakia
Handball players at the 1988 Summer Olympics
People from Myjava
Sportspeople from the Trenčín Region